{{safesubst:#invoke:RfD||2=More "upcoming" no longer upcoming|month = March
|day =  5
|year = 2023
|time = 21:41
|timestamp = 20230305214111

|content=
REDIRECT The Honeymoon (2022 film)

}}